is a passenger railway station  located in the town of Daisen, Tottori Prefecture, Japan. It is operated by the West Japan Railway Company (JR West).

Lines

Station layout
The station consists of one ground-level side platform serving a single bi-directional track. The station building is on the left side facing in the direction of Yonago.The station is unattended.

Adjacent stations
West Japan Railway Company (JR West)

History
Nawa Station opened on March 11, 1909 as a seasonal temporary stop. It was elevated to a full passenger station on February 10,1955. With the privatization of the Japan National Railways (JNR) on April 1, 1987, the station came under the aegis of the West Japan Railway Company.

Passenger statistics
In fiscal 2018, the station was used by an average of 86 passengers daily.

See also
List of railway stations in Japan

References

External links 

 0640724 Nawa Station from JR-Odekake.net 

Railway stations in Tottori Prefecture
Stations of West Japan Railway Company
Sanin Main Line
Railway stations in Japan opened in 1909
Daisen, Tottori